Rudolf Friedrich (4 July 1923 – 15 October 2013) was a Swiss politician, lawyer and member of the Swiss Federal Council (1982–1984). He was elected to the Swiss Federal Council on 8 December 1982 and, for health reason, resigned his office on 20 October 1984. He is affiliated to the Free Democratic Party. During his office time he held the Federal Department of Justice and Police.

References

External links

1923 births
2013 deaths
Members of the Federal Council (Switzerland)
People from Winterthur